Dominik Rešetar (born 27 May 2000) is a Croatian footballer who plays as a striker for Rudeš.

Club career
Rešetar made his professional debut at the age of 17 while playing for NK Inter Zaprešić in the Croatian First Football League1. earning a start against HNK Cibalia on Sept. 23, 2017. He went on to make nine appearances for Zapresic in the 2017-18 season, scoring his first professional goal in a 3-3 draw with NK Slaven Belupo on April 19, 2018.

Rešetar moved to GNK Dinamo Zagreb Academy and played for GNK Dinamo Zagreb II ahead of the 2018-19 campaign, making six appearances in the Croatian Second Football League and one in the UEFA Youth League for Dinamo’s Under-19 squad. In the 2019-20 season, Rešetar played in seven games for Dinamo Zagreb II, tallying the game-winning assist against NK Kustošija on Oct. 20, 2019.

On January 22, 2020, Resetar joined teammate Petar Čuić as they both sent on loan to USL Championship side Sporting Kansas City II ahead of their 2020 campaign.

International career
On the international stage, Rešetar has made 10 appearances for Croatia’s Under-19 team, scoring three goals – two against India on Sept. 4, 2018 and another against Slovenia four days later in a set of friendly matches. His most recent Under-19 cap came in a friendly against Serbia on Feb. 12, 2019.

References

2000 births
Living people
People from Zabok
Association football forwards
Croatian footballers
Croatia youth international footballers
NK Inter Zaprešić players
GNK Dinamo Zagreb II players
Sporting Kansas City II players
NK Rudeš players
Croatian Football League players
First Football League (Croatia) players
USL Championship players
Croatian expatriate footballers
Expatriate soccer players in the United States
Croatian expatriate sportspeople in the United States